Bjarne Kristiansen  (born 25 October 1937) is a Norwegian politician.

He was born in Bømlo to Hans Kristiansen and Johanna B. Hillesøy. He was elected representative to the Storting for the period 1985–1989 for the Labour Party.

References

1937 births
Living people
People from Bømlo
Labour Party (Norway) politicians
Members of the Storting